Taiping Lake is a lake in Anhui, China. It is crossed by the Taiping Lake Bridge.

References

Lakes of Anhui
Huangshan City